Some Guy Who Kills People is a 2012 American comedy-drama-horror film directed by Jack Perez and written by Ryan Levin. The film was made by a conglomerate of production studios: Level 10, Battle of Ireland Films and Litn-Up Films. John Landis was the executive producer.

Plot
A young Ken Boyd is tormented by five other kids from school until he snaps, becomes suicidal, and is institutionalized. Years later, upon Ken's release, he begins to try building a life and reconnecting with the community...and those who put him away start turning up dead.

Cast
 Kevin Corrigan as Ken Boyd
 Barry Bostwick as Sheriff Walt Fuller
 Karen Black as Ruth Boyd
 Leo Fitzpatrick as Irv
 Ariel Gade as Amy Wheeler
 Eric Price as Ernie
 Lucy Davis as Stephanie
 Lou Beatty, Jnr. as Al Fooger
 Janie Haddad as Janet Wheeler
 Ahmed Best as Mayor Maxwell

Production

The film was distributed by Grimm Distribution for theatrical release and DVD sales in October 2012 in the UK.

Reception

Awards
This film was nominated for two awards, the Best Supporting Actor award at the Fangoria Chainsaw Awards (which it did not win) and the Best Picture award at the Nevermore Film Festival (which it did win).

References

External links

2012 films
2012 comedy films
American comedy films
Films directed by Jack Perez
Films produced by John Landis
2010s English-language films
2010s American films